Rhyu Si-min (born July 28, 1959)  is a South Korean politician who served as the 44th Minister of Health and Welfare from February 2006 to May 2007. Before starting his political career since August 2002, he was a journalist of Dong-a Ilbo and The Hankyoreh, with having his continuous progressive and liberal attitudes. He was in the UNDP as an Assembly member (representative) for Deogyang A district, and is a graduate of Seoul National University with a degree in Economics, and master's from the Johannes Gutenberg University of Mainz in Economics. He resigned on May 22, 2007. He declared his presidential candidacy on August 18, 2007.

He was selected by the liberal opposition parties to run for governor of Gyeonggi-do province on May 13, 2010  In December 2011, Rhyu merged his People's Participation Party into the Unified Progressive Party, of which he was one of the co-chairs.

He announced his retirement from politics on February 19, 2013.

Career
After graduating Shim-in Senior High(School) in Daegu, he entered Seoul National University and served as president of the Students' Union in the 1980s. He fought against Chun Doo-hwan's military regime to bring freedom and democracy to his nation, however, he was arrested with an accusation (the SNU Fraction case, which was made by Chun's regime) and enlisted to the DMZ to serve a military service for 33 months. He has become popular in a field of the Democratic movement of South Korea, with claiming his false-charge with 'The grounds of an appeal'(항소이유서) against the Seoul district court which secured by Chun's regime.

After the 1987 election, he married his colleague, Dr. Han Gyeong-hye (한경혜), an SNU graduate in Mathematics (and a fellow of Democratic movement) on November 1988, and served as an aide to Lee Hae Chan (a Member at that moment) for 2 years. After finishing his job, the couple went to Germany to study their majors in the 1990s.

He has predicted that a gigantic scandal affiliated to the Lee Myung-bak government will be eventually publicized due to the two elections in 2012.

Since 2019, Rhyu has been the host of a YouTube show and podcast called "Alileo" which literally means "I want you to know".

On September 25, 2020, he called Kim Jong-un an Enlightenment monarch for officially apologizing for killing the South Korean people, sparking controversy in South Korea.

References

External links
 Official Homepage 
 Simin Gwangjang(시민광장, Official political initiative)
 Simin Sarang(시민사랑, Official on-line fanpage) 
 Simin Maul(시민마을, Online fanpage) 
 Newsimin(뉴 시민, On-line fanpage) 

1959 births
Living people
People from Gyeongju
Members of the National Assembly (South Korea)
United New Democratic Party politicians
Uri Party politicians
Asian social liberals
South Korean progressives
Liberalism in South Korea
Health and Welfare ministers of South Korea
Ryu clan of Pungsan